Triple P is the first studio album by American hip hop and R&B group Platinum Pied Pipers. It was released on Ubiquity Records on May 10, 2005. "Act Like You Know" reached number 21 on the Hot Dance Singles Sales chart.

Reception
Andy Kellman of AllMusic gave the album 4 stars out of 5, saying: "With help from a handful of MCs and vocalists, the producers/musicians cook up a varied array of hybridized backdrops that update 30 years of soul, hip-hop, and crossover jazz."

Track listing

References

External links
 

2005 debut albums
Platinum Pied Pipers albums
Ubiquity Records albums